Löwenstein–Jensen medium, more commonly known as LJ medium, is a growth medium specially used for culture of Mycobacterium species, notably Mycobacterium tuberculosis.

When grown on LJ medium, M. tuberculosis appears as brown, granular colonies (sometimes called "buff, rough and tough"). The medium must be incubated for a significant length of time, usually four weeks, due to the slow doubling time of M. tuberculosis (15–20 hours) compared with other bacteria.

The medium is named after the Austrian pathologist Ernst Löwenstein (1878–1950) and the Danish medical doctor Kai Adolf Jensen (16.7.1894-2.5.1971).

Composition 

The usual composition as applicable to M. tuberculosis is:
 Malachite green
 Glycerol
 Asparagine
 Potato starch
 Coagulated eggs
 Mineral salt solution
 Potassium dihydrogen phosphate
 Magnesium sulfate
 Sodium citrate

The original formulation included starch, which was later found to be unnecessary, so omitted.

Low levels of penicillin and nalidixic acid are also present in LJ medium to inhibit growth of Gram-positive and Gram-negative bacteria, to limit growth to Mycobacterium species only. Presence of malachite green in the medium inhibits most other bacteria. It is disinfected and solidified by a process of inspissation. Presence of glycerol enhances the growth of M. tuberculosis.

If the slopes are made on test tubes, they must be stored in cold and used within a month.

For cultivation of M. bovis, glycerol is omitted and sodium pyruvate is added.

The medium appears green, opaque, and opalescent.

Uses

 For diagnosis of mycobacterial infections
 For testing antibiotic susceptibility of isolates
 For differentiating different species of Mycobacterium (by colony morphology, growth rate, biochemical characteristics, and microscopy)

Alternatives

Alternative culture media

While LJ medium is the most popular means of culturing mycobacteria, as recommended by the International Union against Tuberculosis, several alternative media have been investigated.

Solid media
 Egg-based – Petragnani medium and Dorset medium
 Middlebrook 7H10 agar
 Middlebrook 7H11 agar
 Blood-based – Tarshis medium
 Serum-based – Loeffler medium
 Potato-based – Pawlowsky medium

Liquid media
 Dubos' medium
 Middlebrook 7H9 broth
 Proskauer and Beck's medium
 Sula's medium
 Sauton's medium

Rapid detection techniques

The chief limitation of culture-based techniques is the time it takes to culture positivity, which can be several months. Several new molecular technologies have emerged in recent years to secure more speedy confirmation of diagnosis.

 Polymerase chain reaction
 GeneXpert MTB/RIF
 Loop-mediated isothermal amplification

See also
 Kinyoun stain
 Tuberculosis
 Tuberculosis diagnosis
 Ziehl-Neelsen stain

References 

Microbiological media